Song of the Mysteries is the eleventh and final volume of Janny Wurts' series Wars of Light and Shadow series and also comprises the single volume story Arc V.

The first novel, Curse of the Mistwraith, was first published in 1993.

External links
Song of the Mysteries at Janny Wurts' official site
Excerpt from Song of the Mysteries

Wars of Light and Shadow